Sar Gol (also Romanized as Sargol) is a village in Asgariyeh Rural District, in the Central District of Pishva County, Tehran Province, Iran. At the 2006 census, its population was 1,692, in 351 families.

References 

Populated places in Pishva County